Jalan Batu Maung also known as Jalan Permatang Damar Laut (Penang state road P10) is a major road in Penang, Malaysia. It connects Bayan Lepas to Batu Maung near Penang Aquarium.

List of junctions

References

Roads in Penang